Diadeliomimus is a genus of longhorn beetles of the subfamily Lamiinae, containing the following species:

 Diadeliomimus rufostrigosus Fairmaire, 1897
 Diadeliomimus vadoni Breuning, 1957

References

Desmiphorini